Ho Geok Choo (born 15 April 1956) is a Singaporean former politician. A former member of the governing People's Action Party (PAP), she was the Member of Parliament (MP) for West Coast GRC between 2001 and 2011. She is currently the chief executive officer of Human Capital Singapore.

Personal life
Ho's father, Ho See Beng, was a former PAP Member of Parliament.

Ho graduated from the National University of Singapore with a Master of Science degree in human resource management.

References

1956 births
Living people
Singaporean people of Hokkien descent
Members of the Parliament of Singapore
People's Action Party politicians
National University of Singapore alumni
Singaporean women in politics